Corpus delicti can refer to:

Corpus delicti, a legal term
Corpus Delicti (band), a gothic rock band
Corpus Delicti (novel), a 2009 novel by Juli Zeh
Corpus Delicti (album), an album by Die Form
"Corpus Delicti," an episode from season 6 of Law & Order